The Battle of Itapirú took place on April 17, 1866 in the vicinity of the during the Paraguayan War. The battle marked the beginning of the Allied invasion of Paraguay.

The Battle 

On April 16, Itapirú was heavily bombed by the Imperial Navy while 10,000 troops from the Imperial Army crossed the Paraná River, and the next day, the confrontation with 4,000 Paraguayans took place under the command of Lieutenant Colonel Benítez, resulting in their withdrawal to Itapirú. The battle resulted in about 500 casualties on the Paraguayan side and 337 on the Brazilian side.

Faced with the concentration of Brazilian troops that began the invasion of Paraguayan territory, Francisco Solano López ordered the fortification abandoned, allowing Brazilian troops to occupy it on April 18.

References 

Battles involving Paraguay
Battles of the Paraguayan War
Battles involving Brazil
April 1866 events
Conflicts in 1866
History of Ñeembucú Department